Major Henry Eric Southey Harben (1 August 1900 – 1 October 1971) was an English cricketer.  Harben was a right-handed batsman, though his bowling style is unknown.

Personal life and death
The son of Henry Devenish Harben and Agnes Helen Bostock, he was born at Farnham, Surrey.

Harben married Helen Prudence Ramsay, daughter of the cricketer Francis Ramsay, on 5 June 1927, though the couple later divorced. They had two children. He later married Iris Constance Kathleen de Stacpoole, daughter of George Edward Joseph Patrick de Stacpoole, 5th Duc de Stacpoole and Eileen Constance Palmer, on 29 April 1947, with the couple having three children.

By 1970, Harben was living at Clonriff House, Oughterard, County Galway, Ireland. He died in Malta on 1 October 1971, aged 71.

Army and cricket
He graduated as an Officer Cadet from the Royal Military College, Sandhurst in 1919, entering the 1st King's Dragoon Guards with the rank of 2nd Lieutenant on 16 July 1919. In that same year Harben made his first-class debut for Sussex against Surrey in 1919 County Championship.  He made three further first-class appearances for the county in that season, the last of which came against Kent. In his four first-class matches for Sussex, he scored 126 runs at a batting average of 21.00, with a high score of 34.

Politics
He was Liberal Party candidate for the Watford division of Hertfordshire at the 1945 General Election. He came third and did not stand for parliament again.

References

External links
Henry Harben at ESPNcricinfo
Henry Harben at CricketArchive

1900 births
1971 deaths
1st King's Dragoon Guards officers
English cricketers
Liberal Party (UK) parliamentary candidates
Graduates of the Royal Military College, Sandhurst
People from Farnham
Sussex cricketers
Harben family
British sportsperson-politicians